Hramše is a village in the Municipality of Žalec in east-central Slovenia. It lies in the Hudinja Hills north of Žalec. The area is part of the traditional region of Styria. The municipality is now included in the Savinja Statistical Region.

References

External links
Hramše at Geopedia

Populated places in the Municipality of Žalec